Summa is a composition by Estonian composer Arvo Pärt. It was initially written in 1977 as a choral work (a setting of the Credo), then later scored by Pärt for instruments. It has been described as "gently rocked muted harmonic simplicities back and forth" when it was performed by the Kronos Quartet in 1992.

References

External links
 Summa, for string orchestra from allmusic.com

Compositions by Arvo Pärt